Club Atlético Puerto Nuevo is an Argentine sports club from Campana, Buenos Aires. The club is mostly known for its football team, which currently plays in Primera D, the fifth division of the Argentine league system.

Their name was inspired by a film called Puerto nuevo, starring Pepe Arias. Its colours are inspired by Atlanta. Apart from football, Puerto Nuevo also hosts the practise of swimming, tennis and volleyball.

Team 2019/20 
 .

 
Association football clubs established in 1939
1939 establishments in Argentina